Mr. Robinson Crusoe is a 1932 Pre-Code American film. It is one of the few "talkie" films starring Douglas Fairbanks, Sr., in his penultimate film role; Fairbanks also produced the film and provided the story during the Great Depression. The film was directed by A. Edward Sutherland, a veteran silent film director, for Fairbanks's Elton Productions, and released by United Artists. Steve Drexel (played by Fairbanks) shows a fiery optimism and can-do spirit that matches the Fairbanks screen persona that appears in his most popular films.

The South Seas comedy adventure featured location filming on Tahiti with working titles being Tropical Knight, A Modern Robinson Crusoe and Robinson Crusoe of the South Seas.

Plot summary
The film opens with a title card that reads "From the time Adam and Eve were banished from the Garden of Eden, man has vainly sought to find solace, comfort and earthly pleasures in an artificial world of his own creation. Down through the ages has come that eternal heritage of the urge in every man to turn his back on so-called civilization, to get back to nature and revel in the glories and freedom of a primitive paradise."

The Fairbanks character Steve Drexel voluntarily strands himself on a deserted island on a bet. He intends to re-create civilization (in the form of New York) and carves a comfortable home, complete with a sign reading 52nd Street and Park Avenue out of the jungle. Drexel is joined by his dog, and befriended by a native monkey, parrot, and a wild goat that is captured in one of his traps. He attempts to cultivate a "head-hunter" native as his Man Friday from Robinson Crusoe, but fails as the native escapes.

A woman played by actress Maria Alba runs away from a marriage she does not want on a neighboring island and is trapped in one of his devices. He names her Saturday and she becomes the love interest of the film. In an attempt to communicate with Saturday, he tries German, Spanish, and then Pig Latin. Over the course of the film, she slowly learns rudimentary English.

Eventually, the natives on a nearby island attack the Fairbank's settlement at the behest of the men that bet against the main character. The hero defeats the hostile natives just as his friends arrive and he wins the bet.  Coincidental to their arrival, a separate war party of natives (billed as head-hunters) arrives and attacks. Steve Drexel distracts them as his friends save his animals and head for the yacht. After a harrowing chase, he ends up escaping with his friends, animals and the girl Saturday on the yacht that brought him there. He takes her back to New York where she performs to an appreciative crowd in the Ziegfeld Follies.

Cast
Douglas Fairbanks as Steve Drexel
William Farnum as William Belmont
Earle Browne as Professor Carmichale
Maria Alba as Saturday

Soundtrack
During the filming the sound equipment failed and the film had to be dubbed back in California.

Alfred Newman who had previously scored Fairbanks' Reaching for the Moon composed the score. Newman reused one of his musical themes for the 1937 film The Hurricane where it became a popular song called Moon of Manakoora. Newman's score for The Hurricane was nominated for an Academy Award.

Legacy
Fairbanks biographer Jeffrey Vance writes "Mr. Robinson Crusoe, his last personal production, was designed to meet his responsibilities in the least demanding way. The film was conceived as an inexpensive travelogue masquerading as a narrative film...Free from the hated dialogue that had so confined his type of film, Fairbanks should have been in his element. And yet, despite the primarily visual aspect of the film, his customary ebullience is not in evidence; his character is a hypomanic middle-aged man."

Further reading
Vance, Jeffrey. Douglas Fairbanks. Berkeley, CA: University of California Press, 2008. .

References

External links
 
 
 Public domain download of Mr. Robinson Crusoe
 The text of American Boy's Handy Book at inquiry.net

1932 films
1932 comedy films
1932 adventure films
American black-and-white films
Films directed by A. Edward Sutherland
Films set in Oceania
United Artists films
American adventure comedy films
1930s English-language films
1930s American films
1930s adventure comedy films